This article lists the confirmed national futsal squads for the 1992 FIFA Futsal World Championship tournament held in Hong Kong, between 16 November and 28 November 1992.

Group A



Head coach: Vic Hermans



Head coach: Krys Sobieski

Group B



Head Coach:Mohammad Mayeli Kohan





Group C





Head coach: Takão

Head coach: José Alberto Cubero Carmona

Group D







Head coach:

S
FIFA Futsal World Cup squads